Caer Mote  is a hill of  in the north of the English Lake District near Bothel, Cumbria. Its summit lies just outside the boundary of the Lake District National Park and offers a view of Bassenthwaite Lake. Under the name  Caermote Hill it is the subject of a chapter of Wainwright's book The Outlying Fells of Lakeland. In his original book Wainwright lists the height as 920 feet (280 m), but in the 2011 2nd edition Chris Jesty corrects this to 948 feet.

There is an ancient earthwork enclosure of undetermined age, known as "The Battery" on the northern summit, St. John's Hill. There are traces of a 1st-century AD Roman fort below the hill, to the south east.

Caermote Hill is listed by the Database of British and Irish Hills as a TuMP, and St John's Hill is given the subtitle "Caermote Hill N Top"; both summits are recognised as "Wainwright Outlying Fells".

References

 

Mountains and hills of Cumbria
Fells of the Lake District
Roman sites in Cumbria